Cyperus pinetorum is a species of sedge that is native to parts of Cuba.

See also 
 List of Cyperus species

References 

pinetorum
Plants described in 1916
Flora of Cuba
Taxa named by Nathaniel Lord Britton
Flora without expected TNC conservation status